Irwin Burke (born 23 July 1916, date of death unknown) was a Barbadian cricketer. He played in one first-class match for the Barbados cricket team in 1938/39.

See also
 List of Barbadian representative cricketers

References

External links
 

1916 births
Year of death missing
Barbadian cricketers
Barbados cricketers
People from Saint Michael, Barbados